Zamonth or Samont (son of Monthu) was an ancient Egyptian vizier who was in office at the end of the Twelfth Dynasty, around 1800 BC.

Biography

Zamonth is known from a stela, showing him sitting in front of an offering table. The stela is now on display in the Egyptian Museum of Cairo. Here he bears the titles member of the elite, mayor. overseer of the city and vizier.  The mother of Zamonth is a woman called Zatip. A mouth of Nekhen Zamonth with the same mother is known from several rock inscriptions in Lower Nubia. They date to the years 6 and 9 of king Amenemhat III and report a small military campaign against Nubia. It seems likely that both sources refer to the same person, the Nubian inscriptions belong to the time before he was promoted to the position of a vizier. 

An offering chapel of Senwosret (Vienna AS 198), a reporter of the vizier, may belong to a servant of Zamonth. A person with the same name and title is mentioned on the Stela in Cairo (CG 20102).

Family
Zamonth was married to a lady named Henutpu. Children include:
Senebtifi. The stela of Zamonth shows his son standing opposite him. The inscriptions identify him as the royal sealer and priest of Amun Senebtifi.
Ankhu, a vizier, may have been a son of Zamonth. The wife of Zamonth is called Henutpu, while the mother of Ankhu bore the name Henut, possibly a diminutif. In addition, it is known that Ankhu was the son of a vizier.

References

Viziers of the Twelfth Dynasty of Egypt
Ancient Egyptian overseers of the city